Matir Thikana is a Bangladeshi Bengali language religious film, released on 10 June 2011. Directed  by Shah Alam Kiron. Produced by Golam Morshad and co-produced by Mritunjoy Dev Nath also distributed by Shondahani Kothachitro. The film stars Shakib Khan, Purnima, Alamgir, Diti in the lead roles. While singer James, Mila and Salma  make special appearances.

Plot

Cast
 Shakib Khan as Kallol
 Purnima  as Bristi
 Shakiba
 Alamgir
 Parveen Sultana Diti
 Ali Raj
 Sharmili Ahmed
 Shiba Shanu
 James in a special appearance
 Salma in a special appearance
 Mila Islam in a special appearance

Music

Matir Thikana films music directed by Imon Saha and Ahmed Imtiaz Bulbul. Playback singer's as Andrew Kishor, James, Kanak Chapa, Kona, Salma.

Soundtrack

Critical reception
Upon release, according to Hamidur Rahman and Naziur Rahman the film received mixed reviews from critics in Bangladesh. Daud Hossain Rony of The Daily Kaler Kantho of Bangladesh gave the film 2.5 out of 5 stars.

References

2011 films
Bengali-language Bangladeshi films
Bangladeshi drama films
Films scored by Ahmed Imtiaz Bulbul
Films scored by Emon Saha
2010s Bengali-language films
2011 drama films